Sergei Yuryevich Matveyev  (born 8 September 1972 in Pskov) is a former Olympic rower who competed for Russia in three Olympic Games. He  won the bronze medal in the coxed eight competition.

References 
 
 

1972 births
Living people
Russian male rowers
Rowers at the 1996 Summer Olympics
Rowers at the 2000 Summer Olympics
Rowers at the 2004 Summer Olympics
Olympic rowers of Russia
Olympic bronze medalists for Russia
Sportspeople from Pskov
Olympic medalists in rowing
World Rowing Championships medalists for Russia
Medalists at the 1996 Summer Olympics